Lloyd George "Shorty" Rollins (April 3, 1929 – December 28, 1998) was the first official Rookie of the Year in what is now the NASCAR Cup Series.

Summary
He began stock car racing in Corpus Christi, Texas.  The great success achieved there led him to Fayetteville, North Carolina and NASCAR's Grand National Series.  In his rookie campaign of 1958, he had one win at State Line Speedway, 12 top five finishes and 22 top ten finishes in 29 starts with car owner Spook Crawford. He won the first stock car race at the Daytona International Speedway, a 100-lap qualifying race in the NASCAR Convertible Division, which gave him a second place start in the first Daytona 500 in 1959.  He made 43 starts in three professional seasons and earned $17,018.

He left racing in 1960 with just 43 starts and settled in Pensacola, Florida with his wife, Mozelle, where he established Hurricane Fence Industries. He was a resident of Pensacola until his death at the age of 69.

References

 NASCAR.com
 Career statistics at Racing-Reference.info

1929 births
1998 deaths
NASCAR drivers
People from Granbury, Texas
Sportspeople from Pensacola, Florida
Racing drivers from Texas